The year 547 BC was a year of the pre-Julian Roman calendar. In the Roman Empire, it was known as year 207 Ab urbe condita. The denomination 547 BC for this year has been used since the early medieval period, when the Anno Domini calendar era became the prevalent method in Europe for naming years.

Events
 Croesus seizes the Persian city of Pteria and enslaves its inhabitants. Meanwhile, Cyrus invites the Ionians to join him in battle.
 The Battles of Thymbra and Pteria are fought between Croesus of Lydia and Cyrus the Great.
 Cyrus besieges and captures Sardis.

Births

Deaths
 Anaximander (some sources also give 545 BC or 546 BC)
 Thales of Miletus
 Croesus

References